Sunny Day Carousel (formerly Sea Carousel)  is a Sesame Street themed carousel ride located in Sesame Street Land at SeaWorld Orlando in the United States. Manufactured by Chance Rides, the ride featured a 45 foot wide pink octopus on the top. Riders board colorful horses and float up and down as the carousel revolves. Sea Carousel opened to the public in 2007.

History

In 2006, SeaWorld Orlando added three new family rides for children to Shamu’s Happy Harbor, the Shamu Express, a killer whale-themed roller coaster; Jazzy Jellies, a jellyfish-themed samba tower ride; and Swishy Fishies, a waterspout-themed teacup ride as well as four stories of nets and tunnels, a huge sand box, and a playful pirate ship.

In the following year, the authority announced plans to add a sea-based carousel and two other family rides in the Shamu's Happy Harbour and expanded the area to four acres. and the carousel was opened to the public in summer. It was manufactured by Chance Rides, an American-based roller coaster and amusement ride manufacturing company. The two other rides were Ocean Commotion, a fanta sea themed 19-foot tug boat and the Flying Fiddler, a giant, bright-red fiddler crab that move, fills its belly with 12 children and adults and lifts them to more than 20 feet in the air.

When Shamu's Happy Harbor was rethemed into Sesame Street Land in 2019, the attraction remained unchanged, until it was changed to the Sunny Day Carousel, which opened on November 24, 2021. The sea animals on the ride were replaced by Muppet-style colorful horses.

Attraction summary

Ride 
Sunny Day Carousel features seats modeled after a collection of colorful horses. The duration of the ride is about 2 minutes. The riders must be at least 42 inches tall or accompanied by a supervising companion at least 14 years old to ride.

References

External links
 

Amusement rides introduced in 2007
SeaWorld Orlando
2007 establishments in Florida